The National Museum of Marine Biology and Aquarium (NMMBA) is the most notable museum and research institution for marine biology in Taiwan, which located in Checheng Township, Pingtung County, Taiwan.

In 2004, NMMBA cooperated with National Dong Hwa University to jointly establish NDHU College of Marine Sciences and Graduate Institute of Marine Biology, which was the first academic partnership between university and museum in Taiwan.

Overview
Planning for the museum began in 1991, and the museum opened on 25 February 2000. In addition to the museum, the park surrounding the museum is an outdoor water park (the largest in Taiwan).

The museum has three main exhibits: Waters of Taiwan, Coral Kingdom Pavilion and World Waters Pavilion. The museum also has an  underwater moving track, the largest underwater tunnel in Asia. The building also has several major divisions including the experiment center for aquatic life, public facilities, research facilities, maintenance facilities, an international conference center, and an academic research center.

In 2015, NMMBA was rated fourth best of its kind in Asia by TripAdvisor, receiving 4.5 out of 5 stars.

Exhibitions
The museum has three main exhibitions:

Waters of Taiwan

This exhibit hall features aquatic animals native to Taiwan, from waters as small as rivers to as vast as the open sea. The exhibits are themed after the water systems of Taiwan, starting from the river and the reservoir to the intertidal zone and finally to the open sea. There is also a touch pool featuring marine invertebrates in the intertidal exhibit area. Animals on display include tilapia, Japanese eel, trout, cuttlefish, nurse sharks, Indo-Pacific tarpon, yellowfin tuna, spotted eagle rays, and a whale shark. The main ocean tanks contains  of sea water, has a  acrylic viewing window and an  shark tunnel.

Coral Kingdom
The Coral Kingdom exhibit hall shows different coral reef habitats, from shallow waters to deep oceans. Differing environments based on sea depth, pressure, terrain, and light are shown. An underwater tunnel and a sunken ship are also part of the exhibit hall. At the end of exhibit hall is an underwater tunnel and viewing panels showcasing the aquarium's four beluga whales. It is also possible to see the belugas from above water via a pavilion on the second floor. Animals on display include blacktip reef sharks, lionfish, moray eels, cownose rays, unicornfish, butterflyfish, and garden eels. Beluga whales are housed in an exhibit with a tunnel that allows underwater viewing.

Waters of the World
This exhibit covers ancient, Precambrian oceans as well as ocean formation.

Research
Besides public exhibitions, there are two research buildings and a marine station in the museum, dedicated to research in marine biology and ecology, aquaculture, propagation and conservation of marine fauna and flora. Research carried out at NMMBA includes the effects of pollution on coral and fish and the effects of light on the developmental expression of fluorescent proteins.

In 2014, NMMBA became the first institution to breed the ringed pipefish (Dunckerocampus dactyliophorus) in captivity. The museum used underwater caves and fissured corals to provide an environment for the fish to hatch their eggs. In the 11th month after hatching, the first offspring began mating.

In 2018, the museum teamed up with the Frozen Ark global conservation project for freezing the DNA of local species living at the sea of Pingtung County.

Controversies
In March 2013, Environment and Animal Society of Taiwan (EAST) accused NMMBA of keeping its whale shark in a tank that was too small for a deep-water animal. The shark, which is labeled “vulnerable” by the International Union for Conservation of Nature, had been kept at the aquarium since 2004. EAST claimed that the animal has scars on its tail from hitting coral and the sides of the tank. An official at the aquarium stated that there were plans to tag release the shark in the near future.

On 10 July 2013, the aquarium was again criticized for releasing the shark, without a GPS tracking device, in a manner that caused it to be stranded on the beach twice before being towed out to sea. According to an EAST spokesman, "What the aquarium did was not release the whale shark, the aquarium actually abandoned the shark". EAST expressed concern about the shark's ability to fend for itself after eight years in captivity and the lack of a tracking device that would have allowed scientists to follow its progress. According to the head of NMMBA, Wei-hsien Wang, it "didn't occur to us that it would refuse to swim away but rather would linger near the shore".

See also
 List of museums in Taiwan

References

External links

 

2000 establishments in Taiwan
Aquaria in Taiwan
Museums established in 2000
Museums in Pingtung County
Marine Biology and Aquarium